Alexander Maul (born 24 September 1976) is a German footballer. He is a midfielder who plays currently for SV Seligenporten.

References

External links 
 Alexander Maul at kicker.de 
 FCC Supporter Bio 
 

1976 births
Living people
People from Ansbach (district)
Sportspeople from Middle Franconia
German footballers
Association football midfielders
2. Bundesliga players
3. Liga players
Rot-Weiß Oberhausen players
SSV Jahn Regensburg players
FC Carl Zeiss Jena players
Footballers from Bavaria